Sitona californicus is a species of weevil in the family Curculionidae first described by Carl Gustaf Emil Mannerheim in 1843. It can be found in the Nearctic and in US states such as Arizona and California. In California the species were recorded between March 5, 1925, and February 1, 1926, at Monterey County, Carmel while in Arizona it was found in Pima County in the Santa Rita Mountains.

References

Beetles described in 1843
Endemic fauna of the United States
Beetles of North America